Ethmia angustalatella is a moth in the family Depressariidae. It is found in north-eastern Mexico and Texas.

The ground color of the forewings is brownish gray, interspersed with white, which tends to form markings. The ground color of the hindwings is whitish basally, becoming pale brownish in the distal half. Adults are on wing in September (in Texas).

References

Moths described in 1973
angustalatella